The 1988–89 season was the 92nd season of competitive football in Scotland.

Notable events

Rangers regained their league title and retained the League Cup, but defeat by Celtic in the Scottish Cup final ended their hopes of a domestic treble.

Graeme Souness's acquisition of English players continued with the signing of Norwich City striker Kevin Drinkell and Everton defender Gary Stevens. For the title run-in, he also signed defender Mel Sterland from Sheffield Wednesday, only to sell him to Leeds United in the close season.

Hearts enjoyed the best European run out of all the Scottish clubs, reaching the quarter finals of the UEFA Cup, where they were narrowly beaten by the West German giants Bayern Munich.

Alex Smith and Jocky Scott took joint charge of Aberdeen for the 1988–89 season following the departure of Ian Porterfield after less than two years in charge, but were still unable to return to the club to the glory days of Alex Ferguson, as Rangers and Celtic collected all the major prizes once again.

Scottish Premier Division

Champions: Rangers 
Relegated: Hamilton Academical

Scottish League Division One

Promoted: Dunfermline Athletic
Relegated: Kilmarnock, Queen of the South

Scottish League Division Two

Promoted: Albion Rovers, Alloa Athletic

Other honours

Cup honours

Non-league honours

Senior

Individual honours

SPFA awards

SFWA awards

Scottish clubs in Europe

Results for Scotland's participants in European competition for the 1988–89 season

Celtic

Dundee United

Aberdeen

Heart of Midlothian

Rangers

Scotland national team

Key:
(H) = Home match
(A) = Away match
WCQG5 = World Cup qualifying – Group 5
F = Friendly

See also
1988–89 Aberdeen F.C. season
1988–89 Dundee United F.C. season
1988–89 Rangers F.C. season
 Dubai Champions Cup

Notes and references

 
Seasons in Scottish football